Maranura District in Peru is one of ten districts of the province La Convención and is located in the department of Cusco and remains under the administration of the Regional Government of Cusco .

History

The Maranura District was created by the government of President Manuel Prado Ugarteche on March 15, 1961 by Law 13620.

Authorities

The current Mayor of the Maranura District is Francisco Marcavillaca Alvarez of the Democratic Party We Are Peru. The district has five Aldermen: Sergio Tapia Caballero (SP), Clara Huamán Castilla (SP), Fredy Alagón Ricalde (SP), Obdulia Palma Ttito (SP), Efrain Yabar Becerra (Acuerdo Popular Unificado).

References